It's the Great Pumpkin, Charlie Brown is a 1966 American prime time animated television special based on the comic strip Peanuts by Charles M. Schulz.

A Halloween special, it was the third Peanuts special (and second holiday-themed special, following A Charlie Brown Christmas) to be produced and animated by Bill Melendez. The special features music composed by jazz pianist Vince Guaraldi, whose contributions include the theme song "Linus and Lucy". It was also the first Peanuts special whose title used the pattern of a short phrase followed by "Charlie Brown", a pattern which remained the norm for almost all subsequent Peanuts specials.

Its initial broadcast took place on October 27, 1966 on CBS, preempting My Three Sons, and tied Bonanza as the No. 1 broadcast in that week's Nielsen TV ratings. The original sponsors were Coca-Cola (which had been the original sponsor of A Charlie Brown Christmas) and the Dolly Madison brand of baked snack food. (Dolly Madison continued to co-sponsor the Peanuts specials on CBS for many years.) The special was nominated for a 1966 Emmy Award.

CBS re-aired the special annually through 2000, with ABC picking up the rights beginning in 2001. It aired annually on ABC during the Halloween season until 2019. From 2006 until 2019, ABC usually aired the special twice, once in a truncated format during a half-hour time slot and once in full during an hour-long time slot (filled out with an abridged version of the 1972 special You're Not Elected, Charlie Brown).

Beginning in 2020, Apple TV+ became the exclusive home of all Peanuts specials. The special is also aired on Family Channel in Canada since 2018. In 2021, the special returned to broadcast television on PBS and PBS Kids stations as part of a partnership by Apple and PBS. It aired at 7:30 P.M. ET/PT on October 24, 2021. It would be the only time the special aired on PBS, as the network could not renew the agreement for 2022. Apple allowed non-subscribers free streaming in 2022 from October 28 to 31.

The program has been issued on home video several times, including a Remastered Deluxe Edition of the special released by Warner Home Video on September 2, 2008, with the bonus feature It's Magic, Charlie Brown which was released in 1981. To celebrate its 40th anniversary, a retrospective book was published in 2006. It's the Great Pumpkin, Charlie Brown: The Making of a Television Classic includes the entire script, never-before-seen photographs, storyboard excerpts, and interviews with the original child actors who provided the voices of the Peanuts gang.

A history of the program and the various religious interpretations of Linus' sincere belief in the Great Pumpkin are explained in the 2015 book, A Charlie Brown Religion, published by the University Press of Mississippi.

Plot summary
As Halloween approaches, Linus and Lucy van Pelt go out to the local pumpkin patch to find a pumpkin until Lucy selects the largest they can find; she makes Linus carry it back to the house. He becomes upset when Lucy starts cutting it to make a jack-o-lantern. Later, Snoopy helps Charlie Brown finish raking a pile of leaves. Linus jumps into the heap with a large lollipop, resulting in leaves sticking to his face and a lollipop. Then Lucy entices Charlie Brown to kick her football by showing him a signed agreement, but then pulls it away as usual before pointing out the agreement never got notarized.

Linus is writing his yearly letter to the Great Pumpkin. As he does so, he suffers from Snoopy's laughter, Lucy's threats, Patty's claim he's wasting his time, and Charlie Brown's initial disbelief of him and later outrage of him dragging Sally, his little sister, into it (the only one who, because she's so smitten with him, supports him). Lucy follows Linus as he goes out to mail the letter, refusing to even help him and, thus, leaving him to use his blanket to open the mailbox and let the letter float in. Charlie Brown shows up to announce that he was invited to a Halloween party hosted by Violet. Lucy is skeptical about his invitation, assuming it was sent by mistake.

On Halloween night, the group goes trick-or-treating, with each wearing a costume. Most dress as ghosts in simple white sheet costumes; Charlie Brown has "trouble with the scissors," leaving his costume full of holes. Pig-Pen's trademark dust cloud makes him easy to identify. Lucy dresses as a witch, claiming it represents the opposite of her real personality. On the way, they stop at the pumpkin patch to jeer at Linus for missing the festivities as usual. Undeterred, Linus persuades Sally, due to her infatuation with him, to skip trick-or-treating and join him.

The "tricks or treats" group receives various sweets and some money, except for Charlie Brown, who is given nothing except rocks. After going back to the pumpkin patch to tease Linus and Sally again, they go to Violet's Halloween party. The girls ask Charlie Brown to serve as their model, initially to his delight, then embarrassment, when they use the back of his head to canvas potential jack-o'-lantern designs. Meanwhile, Snoopy, wearing his World War I flying ace costume, climbs aboard his doghouse and imagines it is a Sopwith Camel fighter plane. After a fierce battle with the unseen Red Baron, Snoopy makes his way across "the countryside" to crash the Halloween party. Sneaking into an apple bobbing tank, he accidentally kisses Lucy when she picks up an apple, disgusting her. He is entertained by Schroeder playing off World War I tunes on his piano, but when the sad songs make him cry, he leaves.

Linus and Sally are still in the pumpkin patch when Linus sees a mysterious shadowy figure, which turns out to be Snoopy, rising from the moonlit patch. Linus mistakes Snoopy for the Great Pumpkin, and faints. When Linus wakes, Sally furiously yells at him for making her miss the Halloween festivities, even as Charlie Brown and the others come to take her home. As they leave, Linus, still adamant that the Great Pumpkin will materialize, promises to put in a good word for them if it comes and then panics after realizing that he said if instead of when.

At 4 a.m., Lucy wakes up to find that Linus is not in bed and goes outside. She finds her brother in the pumpkin patch, covered by his blanket, shivering and half asleep. She leads him into the house, takes off his shoes, and puts him to bed.

The next morning, Charlie Brown and Linus lean against a brick wall and commiserate about the previous night. Charlie Brown attempts to console Linus by explaining that he has done many stupid things too. Hearing that makes Linus snap, and he vows that the Great Pumpkin will come to the pumpkin patch next year; Charlie Brown dejectedly listens to Linus’ ranting while credits roll.

Cast
Peter Robbins as Charlie Brown
Christopher Shea as Linus van Pelt
Kathy Steinberg as Sally Brown
Bill Melendez as Snoopy
Sally Dryer as Lucy van Pelt
Gabrielle DeFaria as "Pig-Pen"
Glenn Mendelson as Schroeder/Shermy
Ann Altieri as Violet/Frieda
Lisa DeFaria as Patty

Viewer response

Schulz did not wish to make Charlie Brown's response of "I got a rock" a running gag. As such, he only wanted it as a one-shot joke, where Charlie Brown only gets a rock at one house. Melendez suggested it happen three times. Although executive producer Lee Mendelson disagreed, he was overruled. According to Schulz in the retrospective television special Happy Birthday, Charlie Brown (1979), after the program first aired, bags and boxes of candy came in from all over the world "just for Charlie Brown."

Critical reception
Executive producer Lee Mendelson told The Washington Post that the sequence with Snoopy flying his doghouse was "one of the most memorable animated scenes ever." He also said that of all the Peanuts TV specials, "I believe It's the Great Pumpkin, Charlie Brown is Bill Melendez's animation masterpiece."

Production

Sponsors
Similar to the earlier A Charlie Brown Christmas and Charlie Brown's All-Stars specials,  It's The Great Pumpkin was sponsored by Coca-Cola and Dolly Madison Cakes. These sponsor tags were replaced in later broadcasts and edited out of the VHS/DVD releases.

Music

The score was performed by the Vince Guaraldi Sextet, featuring Guaraldi on piano, Monty Budwig on double bass, Colin Bailey on drums, John Gray on guitar, Ronald Lang on woodwinds and Emmanuel Klein on trumpet. It was orchestrated by John Scott Trotter, arranged by Guaraldi and Robert G. Hartley. All the music was recorded on October 4, 1966, at Desilu's Gower Street Studio in Hollywood.

The Peanuts franchise signature tune, "Linus and Lucy", is featured prominently three times:
during the cold open sequence when Linus and Lucy prepare a pumpkin to be a jack-o-lantern;
as Linus mails his letter to the Great Pumpkin; and 
when Lucy wakes up at 4 AM to take Linus home from the pumpkin patch.

Guaraldi's theme for the special, "Great Pumpkin Waltz", is first heard when Linus is writing the Great Pumpkin at the beginning and plays throughout. The World War I songs played by Schroeder while Snoopy dances are: "It's a Long Way to Tipperary", "There's a Long, Long Trail", "Pack Up Your Troubles in Your Old Kit-Bag", and "Roses of Picardy". Guaraldi historian and author Derrick Bang commented that the music Guaraldi composed for the special "emphatically established the Peanuts 'musical personality'," adding that the version of "Linus and Lucy" featured during the cold open was "arguably the best arrangement…that Guaraldi ever laid down, thanks in great part to Ronald Lang's flute counterpoint." (This version was again utilized in the 1969 feature film A Boy Named Charlie Brown.)

Craft Recordings released the complete soundtrack album from the special on October 12, 2018. (Previously, only "Great Pumpkin Waltz" was released on the 1998 posthumous compilation album, Charlie Brown's Holiday Hits, as well as Guaraldi's subsequent cover version released on the Warner Bros. Records release, Oh Good Grief!.) Following criticism, Craft Recordings reissued the soundtrack in August 2022 using newly discovered original master tapes, without sound effects from the television special.

Home media
The special was released on RCA's SelectaVision CED format in 1982 along with the specials You're Not Elected, Charlie Brown, It Was a Short Summer, Charlie Brown, and A Charlie Brown Thanksgiving. It's the Great Pumpkin, Charlie Brown was first released on VHS by Media Home Entertainment in 1985 and Hi-Tops Video in 1988, as part of the "Snoopy's Home Video Library" set. This version included editing of the "trick-or-treat" scene to limit the scene to just the first house, and also removed the entire sequence of Schroeder playing World War I-era songs. Paramount Home Video later released the special in its entirety on VHS on August 17, 1994. It was re-released by the studio on October 1, 1996, and reprinted on October 7, 1997. It was released on DVD on September 12, 2000, with You're Not Elected, Charlie Brown as a bonus special.

After Warner Home Video had obtained the off-air rights to the Charlie Brown library of TV specials, they released a new DVD release under the new "Remastered Deluxe Edition" line on September 2, 2008. On this DVD, the bonus special was It's Magic, Charlie Brown (You're Not Elected, Charlie Brown was released on its own DVD later that year), and it included a new featurette, "We Need a Blockbuster, Charlie Brown". A Blu-ray/DVD combo pack was released on September 7, 2011, with the same features as the Warner DVD. The feature was later released on 4K UHD on October 10, 2017.

References

External links

1960s animated television specials
CBS television specials
Film and television memes
Internet memes
Television shows directed by Bill Melendez
Halloween television specials
Peanuts television specials
1966 television specials
1960s American television specials
Television shows written by Charles M. Schulz